Alexandre Gelbert (29 September 1910 – 23 December 1988) was a Swiss sailor. He competed in the 6 Metre event at the 1936 Summer Olympics.

References

External links
 

1910 births
1988 deaths
Swiss male sailors (sport)
Olympic sailors of Switzerland
Sailors at the 1936 Summer Olympics – 6 Metre
Place of birth missing
20th-century Swiss people